The 1958 Nippon Professional Baseball season was the ninth season of operation of Nippon Professional Baseball (NPB).

Regular season

Standings

Postseason

Japan Series

League leaders

Central League

Pacific League

Awards
Most Valuable Player
Motoshi Fujita, Yomiuri Giants (CL)
Kazuhisa Inao, Nishitetsu Lions (PL)
Rookie of the Year
Shigeo Nagashima, Yomiuri Giants (CL)
Tadashi Sugiura, Nankai Hawks (PL)
Eiji Sawamura Award
Masaichi Kaneda, Kokutetsu Swallows (CL)

See also
1958 Major League Baseball season

References